Melanoleuca is a genus of mushrooms in the family Tricholomataceae. 

Melanoleuca, derived from the Ancient Greek melano- meaning "black", and leukos meaning "white", may refer to:
 Melanoleuca, a junior synonym of the moth genus Ethmia
 Ailuropoda melanoleuca, the binomial name of the giant panda